Estrada — originally, a kind of stage for performances. Now this term also means a kind of scenic art of small forms of mainly popular-entertaining direction, including such directions as singing, dance, circus on stage, illusionism, colloquial genre, parody, clownery. As a kind of cultural and economic activity, the Estrada is an integral part of show business.

Artists performing in the Estrada genre are called Estrada Artist or Artist of Estrada.
The Russian estrada nowadays is a diverse group of artists representing both pop-song genre and other genres of theatrical art. Alla Pugacheva, Anna German, Valery Leontiev, Sofia Rotaru, Philip Kirkorov, Oleg Gazmanov, Lev Leshchenko, Iosif Kobzon, vocal and instrumental ensembles, pop groups and rock bands represent the variety-song genre: "Samotsvety", "Pesnyary", "Mashina Vremeni" ,"Zemlyane"," Aria ","Alice","Mumiy Troll", "Zemfira" and many others. The spoken genre is represented by such artists as Gennady Khazanov, Evgeny Petrosyan, Efim Shifrin, Victor Koklyushkin, Klara Novikova, Semyon Altov, Lion Izmailov, Mikhail Zadornov, Pavel Volya, Garik Martirosyan, the Urals pelmeni team, etc.

From the musical-creative point of view (more specific) in Russia (the USSR) and North Korea, the term "Estrada" is also called a closed group of people whose speeches are broadcast exclusively on state TV. The so-called "state actors", that is, the performances of which are approved by the dominant party (CPSU, Juche Party). At the same time, all the rest can be strictly censored.

There are also Estrada theaters, for example, the Moscow Estrada Theater, the St. Petersburg Estrada Theater. In such theaters, as a rule, the spoken genre predominates (for example, reprises and humoresks), as well as humorous and satirical plays and miniatures are staged.

In the press, writing about estrada performers and estrada stars, sometimes an allegorical classification is used, adding the title to the name of the estrada artist. For example, "prima donna of the Russian estrada", "king of glamor", "king of Russian chanson". Also, official honorary title, included in the system of state awards of the Russian Federation, as "Honored Artist of Russia" or "People's Artist of Russia" can often be added.

References

Entertainment industry
Pop music genres
Soviet music